Myriopteris yavapensis, formerly known as Cheilanthes yavapensis, is a species of cheilanthoid fern with the common name Yavapai lip fern native to the southwest United States.

Description
Myriopteris yavapensis is a small fern growing from a long creeping rhizome that is 1 to 3 mm in diameter with bicolored scales. Leaves are scattered and 7 to 35 cm long and 2 to 6 cm wide with a dark brown petiole. The leaf blade is oblong-lanceolate to nearly ovate and up to 4-pinnate (highly divided) at base. The ultimate leaf segments are very small, round to oblong and beadlike, with the largest usually 1 to 2 mm in length. Leaves are abaxially (lower side) glabrous or with a few small scales near the base, and adaxially (upper side) appearing sparsely pubescent but actually nearly glabrous (the few hairs come from the rachis and costa, which also have abundant broader scales). The costae are green adaxially for most of length, with conspicuous overlapping abaxial scales up to 1 mm wide at their base, and in shape lanceolate, truncate, to cordate,  with coarse cilia usually distributed the entire length of scale. The leaflet edges curl under to form a false indusium that partially covers the sori. Myriopteris yavapensis is very similar morphologically to Myriopteris wootonii, and careful study will be necessary to determine the proper disposition of many specimens.

Range and habitat
Myriopteris yavapensis is native to mountains in Arizona, New Mexico, and Texas. It grows on rocky slopes and ledges, usually on igneous substrates, at 500 to 2400 meters in elevation.

Taxonomy
Myriopteris yavapensis is an apogamous (asexual, producing spores without fertilization) tetraploid, apparently formed by hybridization between Myriopteris lindheimeri (maternal) and Myriopteris covillei (paternal).

References

Works cited

Ferns of the Americas
yavapensis